Simon Steward may refer to:

 Simon Steward (judge) (born 1969), Australian judge
 Simon Steward (MP) (1575–1632), British politician